The Râul Alb is a left tributary of the river Strei in Romania. The upper reach of the river is also known as Vasielu. It flows into the Strei in Ohaba de sub Piatră.

References

Rivers of Romania
Rivers of Hunedoara County